Pliocyon is an extinct genus of bear dogs which inhabited North America during the Middle Miocene 16.0—13.6 Ma, existing for approximately . Fossils have been uncovered in South Florida, Oregon, and western Nebraska.

References

Bear dogs
Miocene carnivorans
Serravallian extinctions
Miocene mammals of North America
White River Fauna
Aquitanian genus first appearances
Prehistoric carnivoran genera